The Book of Odes is a book of the Bible found only in Eastern Orthodox Bibles and included or appended after the Psalms in Alfred Rahlfs' critical edition of the Septuagint, coming from the fifth-century Codex Alexandrinus. The chapters are prayers and songs (canticles) from the Old and New Testaments. The first nine of them form the basis for the canon sung during matins and other services.

Content
Chapters of this book as presented by Rahlfs are:
 First Ode of Moses (Exodus 15:1–19)
 Second Ode of Moses (Deuteronomy 32:1–43)
 Prayer of Anna, the Mother of Samuel (1 Samuel 2:1–10)
 Prayer of Habakkuk (Habakkuk 3:2–19)
 Prayer of Isaias (Isaiah 26:9–20)
 Prayer of Jonah (Jonah 2:3–10)
 Prayer of Azariah (Daniel 3:26–45, a deuterocanonical portion)
 Song of the Three Young Men (Daniel 3:52–90, a deuterocanonical portion)
 The Magnificat; Prayer of Mary the Theotokos (Luke 1:46–55)
 Benedictus Canticle of Zachariah (Luke 1:68–79)
 The Song of the Vineyard: A Canticle of Isaiah (Isaiah 5:1–7)
 Prayer of Hezekiah (Isaiah 38:10–20)
 Prayer of Manasseh, King of Judah when he was held captive in Babylon (ref. in 2 Chronicles 33:11–13 and appears also as a separate deuterocanonical book)
 Nunc dimittis; Prayer of Simeon (Luke 2:29–32)
 Gloria in Excelsis Deo; Canticle of the Early Morning (some lines from Luke 2:14, and Psalm 35:10-11; 118:12; and 144:2)

See also
 Deuterocanonical books in Orthodox Christianity
 Odes of Solomon

References

External links
 
 James A Miller, "Let us sing to the Lord": The Biblical Odes in the Codex Alexandrinus (January 1, 2006). Dissertations (1962 - 2010) Access via Proquest Digital Dissertations. Paper AAI3231313. 
 James Mearns, The Canticles of the Christian Church, Eastern and Western, in Early and Medieval Times, Cambridge University Press, 1914.
 Henry Barclay Swete, An Introduction to the Old Testament in Greek, Cambridge University Press, 1914, page 253.
 David Lincicum, Septuagint Odes
Rev. Symeon-Anthony Beck, Notes on the Codex Alexadrinus Psalter

Anagignoskomena
Texts in the Septuagint